Greater Manchester East was, from 1984 to 1999, a European Parliament constituency centred on Greater Manchester, in North West England.

From 1984 to 1994, it consisted of the Westminster Parliament constituencies of Ashton-under-Lyne, Cheadle, Denton and Reddish, Hazel Grove, Oldham Central and Royton, Oldham West, Stalybridge and Hyde, and Stockport.  From 1994 to 1999 it consisted of Ashton-under-Lyne, Denton and Reddish, Heywood and Middleton, Littleborough and Saddleworth, Oldham Central and Royton, Oldham West, Rochdale, and Stalybridge and Hyde.

Before its uniform adoption of proportional representation in 1999, the United Kingdom used first-past-the-post for the European elections in England, Scotland and Wales. The European Parliament constituencies used under that system were smaller than the later regional constituencies and only had one Member of the European Parliament each.

Members of the European Parliament

Election results

References

External links
 David Boothroyd's United Kingdom Election Results 

European Parliament constituencies in England (1979–1999)
Politics of Greater Manchester
1984 establishments in England
1999 disestablishments in England
Constituencies established in 1984
Constituencies disestablished in 1999